Chionodes grandis is a moth in the family Gelechiidae. It is found in North America, where it has been recorded from southern Manitoba and southern British Columbia to California and New Mexico.

References

Chionodes
Moths described in 1947
Moths of North America